Un crisantemo estalla en cinco esquinas is a 1998 Argentine, Brazilian, French, and Spanish comedy-drama film written and directed by Daniel Burman, in feature film debut. It was produced by Diego Dubcovsky. It stars José Luis Alfonzo, Pastora Vega and Martin Kalwill, among others.

Film critic Anthony Kaufman, writing for indieWIRE, an online community of independent filmmakers and aficionados, said Burman's A Chrysanthemum Burst in Cincoesquinas (1998) has been cited as the beginning of the "New Argentine Cinema" wave.

Synopsis
The story takes place in South America at the turn of the 20th century. As a child, Erasmo was left with a nurse by his parents, who had to escape a waging civil war.  Erasmo is now a grown man.  He has lost his parents, and now his foster mother is brutally murdered. He seeks to avenge her death, and the culprit is the landowner and head of state, El Zancudo. Erasmo befriends a poor Jew named Saul, who is prepared to help him in his undertaking. Along the way, Erasmo finds allies, adversaries, love, and then Magdalena.

Cast
 José Luis Alfonzo as Erasmo
 Pastora Vega as La Gallega
 Martin Kalwill as Saul
 Valentina Bassi as Magdalena
 Millie Stegman as La Boletera
 Walter Reyno as El Zancudo
 Roly Serrano as Cachao
 Ricardo Merkin as Doctor
 Aldo Romero as Lucio
 María Luisa Argüello as Elsa
 Sandra Ceballos as Mother
 Guadalupe Farías Gómez as Albina
 Antonio Tarragó Ross as Chamamecero

Distribution
The film was first presented at the Berlin International Film Festival on February 11, 1998. It opened in Argentina on May 7, 1998. It screened at the Muestra de Cine Argentino en Medellín, Colombia.

Awards
Wins
 Sochi International Film Festival, Sochi, Russia: FIPRESCI Prize, Daniel Burman.

References

External links
 
 
 Un crisantemo estalla en cinco esquinas at the cinenacional.com 
 

1998 films
1998 comedy-drama films
Brazilian comedy-drama films
Argentine independent films
1990s Spanish-language films
Brazilian independent films
French independent films
Spanish independent films
Films directed by Daniel Burman
1998 independent films
French comedy-drama films
Spanish comedy-drama films
Argentine comedy-drama films
1990s French films
Spanish-language French films